Patrícia Teixeira (born 28 September 1990) is a Brazilian basketball player for São José Desportivo and the Brazilian women's national team, where she participated at the 2014 FIBA World Championship.

She was also a member of the Brazil women's national basketball team which competed at the 2015 Pan American Games.

References

1990 births
Living people
Brazilian women's basketball players
Point guards
Basketball players at the 2015 Pan American Games
Basketball players at the 2019 Pan American Games
Pan American Games medalists in basketball
Shooting guards
Pan American Games gold medalists for Brazil
Medalists at the 2019 Pan American Games